Firmin Desloge Hospital is a hospital in St. Louis, Missouri, opened in 1932 by the Jesuits of Saint Louis University and the Sisters of Saint Mary. Named for the benefactor, Firmin V. Desloge, it was established to serve the poor and others in need. Located on Grand Avenue between Vista Avenue and Rutger Avenue, Firmin Desloge Hospital is today the main hospital building of the St. Louis University Medical Center.

History

Creation

In February 1930, Saint Louis University received a $1 million bequest ($ today) from the estate of Firmin Vincent Desloge, a member of the Desloge Family in America, who provided in his will, funds for a hospital to serve St. Louis University and to replace the old St. Mary's Hospital, both in St. Louis. Desloge's wife, Lydia Desloge (née Lydia Holden Davis), donated another $100,000 to build a chapel next to the hospital.

The building was designed by Study, Farrar and Majors, with Arthur Widmer, in the Modern Gothic Revival style. Construction began in the fall of 1930, with an estimated cost of $1.25 million.  Archbishop John Glennon formally laid the cornerstone of the hospital on June 22, 1931.

The 250-foot structure rises ten stories above a high basement, and reflects the Modern Gothic Revival style. The basement and first two stories are covered with ashlar limestone, projecting out from the building at the center and end blocks. These projections display Gothic pointed-arched openings and flat, slender pilasters; the central projection has a monumental porch with compound arches. Above this three-story base, the building steps back, its five divisions composed of narrow piers with double hung windows and brick spandrels. The building is crowned by a steeply pitched hipped roof of copper-covered lead, pierced with wall and roof dormers in a variety of configurations.

The building was dedicated on November 3, 1933. At the ceremony, Desloge's son Firmin (III) noted that the roof was covered by lead, the source of the family's fortune, and said, "That’s a good cap on things".

 Its chapel, Desloge Chapel, was designed by the Gothic revivalist architect Ralph Adams Cram, appointed with stained glass by Emil Frei and sculpture by John Angel, and consecrated later that year.

Operation
Operated under the auspices of the Sisters of St. Mary, the new hospital had 206 beds: two-thirds were double-occupancy rooms and the rest private rooms — a departure from the open wards of the day. In keeping with the Desloge family dedication to service and advancement, Firmin Desloge Hospital was also specifically for African Americans, and served as a nursing school for African American women.
In 1877 the Sisters of St. Mary established a 150-bed hospital at 1526 Papin called St. Mary's Infirmary for the poor. In 1933 the infirmary was opened to African Americans with African American physicians and a mix of white and African American nurses. Physicians of St. Louis University Medical School served as consultant physicians. The Sisters of St. Mary had a nursing school for African American women at St. Mary's Infirmary. The cited author above, John C Crichton as erroneously ascribed the history of St Mary's Infirmary to Firmin Desloge Hospital.
In 1959, administration of Firmin Desloge Hospital shifted completely to Saint Louis University. At this time, Firmin Desloge Hospital, the Bordley Memorial Pavilion and the David P. Wohl Sr. Memorial Institute were collectively renamed Saint Louis University Hospitals.

In 1983, the Desloge family gave money to illuminate the peaked copper roof to mark the hospital's fiftieth anniversary.

Continuous growth and the need for modern facilities and equipment resulted in the construction of a new hospital facility as an addition to the original structure. This new part of the hospital was built directly behind the old Firmin Desloge Hospital at a cost of $39.1 million. The first patients moved in on January 30, 1988.

In 1998, Saint Louis University sold the chapel, along with the hospital, to Tenet Healthcare Corp., a for-profit chain based in Dallas.

In 2015, the university bought back the hospital, then gave it to SSM Health, "the Creve Coeur-based health care system sponsored by the Franciscan Sisters of Mary, formerly Sisters of Saint Mary. The facility will become SSM St. Louis University Hospital.

The hospital tower continues to serve the hospital as physician offices and administrative space. The original copper-covered roof remains a St. Louis landmark and is a distinctive part of the City of St. Louis's skyline.

Future
As of October 2015, SSM Health was planning to spend $500 million to rebuild and expand the hospital. Various media reported that the options under consideration include demolishing the 1933 hospital tower; SSM officials say they have not ruled that out. Desloge scion Christopher Desloge has launched an effort to preserve the hospital building and chapel that his family helped build, perhaps by adaptive uses including, for example, a museum to the African American experience in healthcare and nursing in St. Louis.

The preservation of the hospital is supported by the local chapter of the American Institute of Architects, the Les Amis historical organization, and the Landmarks Association of St. Louis, whose executive director said, "In the pantheon of St. Louis architecture and signature buildings, these are really way up there." The executive director also asserted that the building would be "considered eligible for listing in the National Register of Historic Places and classified as "High Merit" under the terms of the St. Louis City Preservation Ordinance (64689)".

In February 2016, a letter urging the hospital's preservation was sent to SSM from 31 groups, including the Landmarks Association, the National Trust for Historic Preservation, Missouri Advisory Council on Historic Preservation, Preservation Research Office, American Institute of Architects, Foundation for Commercial Philanthropy, Sam Fox School of Design & Visual Arts at Washington University in St. Louis, US Representative Russ Carnahan, the Society of Architectural Historians, and numerous neighborhood associations and alderpersons. Separately, the Foundation for Commercial Philanthropy proposed to lease several floors of the tower to a nonprofit incubation center, seek millions of dollars in historic tax credits, and launch a campaign to raise $15 million to $20 million. Desloge and Landmarks Association of St. Louis director Andrew Weil say this would eliminate the financial burden on SSM.

In May 2016, the Landmarks Association called Firmin Desloge Hospital and Chapel the city's most endangered historical buildings.

In September 2016, the St. Louis City Planning & Urban Design Agency’s Planning Commission convened to evaluate SSM's presented plans to save Desloge Tower in which the owners proposed to be rehabbed to accommodate medical offices. "A representative of SSM Health stated that while no decision has been finalized, it is “highly likely” that 15-story French Gothic Revival Desloge tower will be converted to office space".

In November 2016, St. Louis University released to the St. Louis Planning Commission a $750 million redevelopment plan for 400 acres in midtown St. Louis, an area which encompasses Desloge Hospital Tower. Uses within the area include medical and educational uses including offices and training facilities for those in the health care and life sciences; classrooms and related instructional, laboratory, research, hospice, nursery and day care spaces; and pharmacy facilities. 
Office facilities for private, public and non-profit institutions, businesses and agencies; research facilities. The planning commission unanimously approved the plan. According to the St. Louis Post-Dispatch, the iconic Firmin Desloge tower along Grand Boulevard appears safe for now. The plan doesn't call for tearing it down.

References

External links 
 Hospital Information Page
 Les Amis organization
 Landmarks Association of St. Louis
 Fox 2 News St. Louis
  KSDK News St. Louis
  STL Today St. Louis
  St. Louis Public Radio

Hospital buildings completed in 1933
Hospitals in St. Louis
Skyscrapers in St. Louis
Buildings and structures in St. Louis
1933 establishments in Missouri
Desloge family